The Women in Film and Television UK or WFTV Awards are presented in an annual award programme hosted by the Women in Film and Television (UK) to the most talented women in UK film, TV and digital media.

Annual ceremony

The ceremony previously took place in December at London's Park Lane Hilton Hotel.

Awards categories (competitive)

Each year nominations are being accepted in thirteen categories in total covering all areas of the industry including directing, business, performance, project management and producing.

Once the nomination window closes, independent juries of esteemed people within the film and TV industry will decide on the winners in each category.

Ceremonies

Award Winners

2010

2011

2012

2013

2014

2015

2016

2017

2018

Patrons
WFTV UK Patrons include:
 Gurinder Chadha 
 Elizabeth Karlsen
 Sandi Toksvig

References

External links
  
 "Women in Film and Television UK - The 2002 Awards" (PDF), Carlton Television,  6 December 2002.

Annual events in the United Kingdom
Women's film organizations
British film awards
British television awards